Rhinactinidia is a genus of Asian plants in the tribe Astereae within the family Asteraceae.

Species
The only recognized species is Rhinactinidia limoniifolia, native to Mongolia, Tibet, Kazakhstan, Siberia, Kazakhstan, and Uzbekistan
formerly included
see Aster
 Rhinactinidia eremophila (Bunge) Novopokr. ex Botsch. -  Aster eremophilus Bunge
 Rhinactinidia novopokrovskyi (Krasch. & Iljin) Novopokr. ex Botsch. -  Aster novopokrovskyi Iljin
 Rhinactinidia popovii (Botsch.) Botsch. -  Aster popovii Botsch.

References

Astereae
Monotypic Asteraceae genera
Flora of Asia